Stephen King (born 1947) is an American author.

Stephen King, Steven King or Steve King may also refer to:

Entertainment
 Steve King (audio engineer) (1958–2014), American record producer and audio engineer
 Steve King (radio) (born 1940), American radio personality
 Stephen James King (born 1983), Australian TV and stage actor

Politics
 Stephen King (conservationist), New Zealand conservationist
 Steve King (Colorado legislator) (born 1965), Colorado state senator
 Steve King (born 1949), Former U.S. Representative from Iowa
 Steve King (ambassador) (born 1941), Wisconsin businessman and the US Ambassador to the Czech Republic
 Steven King (journalist), former chief political adviser to the Ulster Unionist Party leader David Trimble

Sports

Football
 Steve King (American football) (born 1951), American football player
 Stephen King (Gaelic footballer), former Gaelic football player for Cavan
 Steven King (footballer) (born 1978), Australian football player
 Stephen King (soccer) (born 1986), American Major League Soccer player

Ice hockey
 Steve King (ice hockey) (born 1948), Canadian ice hockey player
 Steven King (ice hockey) (born 1969), American ice hockey player

Other sports
 Steve King (canoeist) (born 1952), Canadian sprint canoeist
 Steven King (jockey) (born 1968–9), Australian jockey
 Steve King (baseball) (1844–1895), American baseball player

In other fields
 Stephen D. King (born 1963), British economist
 Stephen King (priest), Anglican priest
 Stephen King (surveyor) (1841–1915), Australian explorer

Characters
 Stephen King (The Dark Tower), a fictionalized, yet semi-autobiographical character of the author's creation

See also
 King Stephen (disambiguation)